"País do Futebol" is a single by Brazilian recording artist MC Guimê, featuring Brazilian rapper Emicida. It was used as the theme song of the telenovela Geração Brasil. The song's chorus mentions and pays tribute to football player Neymar, as well as the player appears in the music video.

Music video 
The music video was released on November 3, 2013 at the MC Guimê's channel in YouTube, and made available for digital download on iTunes on the same day.

Charts

Weekly charts

Notes 

2013 singles
Male vocal duets
MC Guimê songs
Emicida songs
2013 songs
Songs about Brazil
Songs about association football players
Cultural depictions of Brazilian men
Football songs and chants
Telenovela theme songs